Uganda sent a delegation to compete in the 2020 Summer Paralympics in Tokyo in Japan originally scheduled to take place in 2020 but postponed to 23 July to 8 August 2021 because of the COVID-19 pandemic. This was the country's ninth appearance in the Summer Paralympics since debuting at the 1972 Summer Paralympics.

Medalists

Competitors

Athletics

Men 
Track

Women 
Track

Badminton 

Ritah Asiimwe has qualified to compete.

See also
 Uganda at the 2020 Summer Olympics

References

Nations at the 2020 Summer Paralympics
2020
2021 in Ugandan sport